Caio Jotta Collet (born 3 April 2002) is a Brazilian racing driver who is currently competing in the FIA Formula 3 Championship for Van Amersfoort Racing. He is the champion of the 2018 French F4 Championship and a former member of the Alpine Academy.

Career

Karting 
Collet began his career in karting at the age of seven, claiming multiple titles in his native Brazil, before moving to Europe where his performances led him to being signed to the Birel ART team in 2016 and eventually Nicolas Todt's All Road Management scheme.

Lower formulae 
At the start of 2018 Collet made his single-seater debut for Silberpfeil Energy Dubai in the 2017–18 Formula 4 UAE Championship. Collet impressed as he finished his first race in 3rd position behind Leon Köhler and David Schumacher, Collet only competed in the 3rd and 4th rounds of the season however in those seven races he finished on the podium in every race bar one. This amounted in 124 points and 6th position, his only win came at round 4, race 3 where he beat Moroccan Sami Taoufik and Finn William Alatalo to the top step of the podium.

Racing under the number 23, Collet was the only Brazilian on the French F4 grid in 2018. Collet finished the first four races on the podium including his first of seven wins that season. Collet had the opportunity to win the championship a round early at Jerez, In the first race Collet took pole and slowly built is advantage over Adam Eteki who qualified second. The race finished Collet 1st, Leclerc 2nd and guest driver Ghiretti finished 3rd. In the reverse grid race Collet started 10th due to his win the round previously where he climbed through the field to finish 5th between De Pauw and Leclerc. A dominant final race which he won confirmed his place as Champion regardless of where his rivals finished that race. Collet collected 303.5 points that season along with 11 podiums and 3 pole positions, he finished with 66.5 more than closest championship rival Ugo de Wilde. This gained Collet a place in the Renault Young Driver Program.

Formula Renault Eurocup

2019 
Due to his success in the 2018 French F4 Championship, Collet was given a drive in the 2019 Formula Renault Eurocup championship with R-ace GP alongside Oscar Piastri, Aleksandr Smolyar and Grégoire Saucy. Collet finished on the podium for the first time in round three at Monaco where he finished 3rd. Collet would go on to finish the season with 5 podiums, the best of which was second place at Spa-Francorchamps, 5th was the eventual finish position of Collet with 207 points which was 113 points behind champion and teammate Piastri.

2020 
Collet would remain with R-ace GP for the 2020 season. His season started out in strong fashion, with three podiums in the first three races, which included his first Eurocup victory at the Imola Circuit. Though at the third round at the Nürburgring the Brazilian missed out on the podium altogether, as his former Renault stablemate Victor Martins took both wins. The next few rounds would see first and second-place finishes from Collet and Martins at Magny-Cours and Zandvoort respectively, however, at the Circuit de Barcelona-Catalunya the Frenchman was able to regain control of the championship with two victories. The seventh event of the season at Spa-Francorchamps was even worse for Collet's title hopes, as, for the first time in four rounds he didn't end up on the rostrum, whilst his rival did. In round eight at Imola Collet bounced back and won race one, but was taken out from second place on the first lap by David Vidales, losing more ground to the French ART driver. And although the Brazilian won race one at Hockenheim he wasn't able to get any closer to Martins in the standings, due to a mechanical issue in the second race. At the penultimate race of the season Martins clinched the title, with 44 points splitting Martins and Collet at the end of the year.

Toyota Racing Series 
Collet competed in the 2020 Toyota Racing Series for MTEC Motorsport. At the first race he almost had the perfect race with pole, fastest lap and the race win however he performed a practice start on the formation lap meaning his win was inherited to Kiwi Liam Lawson as Collet got a 5-second penalty meaning he finished 7th. Collet eventually won a race at the next round at Teretonga Park, which was his first and only victory and podium that campaign. Collet finished seventh with 219 points.

FIA Formula 3

2021 

In October 2020, Collet joined the post-season test at Catalunya partaking with MP Motorsport on the second day and achieving a P10 finish in the afternoon session. Later that month, Collet joined reigning team champions Prema Racing for the first day of the second post-season test at Jerez.
On 10 February 2021, it was announced that Collet would race for MP Motorsport in the 2021 season, partnering Formula Renault title rival Victor Martins and Dutchman Tijmen van der Helm. Similar to his 2020 season, Collet's campaign would start with third place in Barcelona, after which he went on to score two further points finishes in that round. The following round in France Collet scored his maiden podium in a feature race, earning himself 15 points through another third place. The Brazilian couldn't keep his form up as he only scored six points from the next six races at Spielberg and Budapest, but after finishing ninth in the first race at Spa he ended up in the top five in the following six races. Collet ended his campaign in ninth place, second-highest of all rookies, and was just four places behind teammate Martins.

2022 

Collet was retained by MP Motorsport for the 2022 season.

2023 
Despite not appearing in the previous year's post-season test, Collet switched to Van Amersfoort Racing for his third Formula 3 season in 2023.

Formula One 
In 2019, Collet was signed by the Renault Sport Academy. Collet was included in the academy's line-up when it was rebranded to Alpine F1 Team in 2021. At the start of 2023, Collet was dropped from the academy. Despite that, Collet explained that he was "still linked to Alpine" and is "still in contact".

Karting record

Karting career summary

Racing record

Career summary 

* Season still in progress.

Complete French F4 Championship results 
(key) (Races in bold indicate pole position) (Races in italics indicate fastest lap)

Complete Formula Renault Eurocup results 
(key) (Races in bold indicate pole position) (Races in italics indicate fastest lap)

‡ Half points awarded as less than 75% of race distance was completed.

Complete Toyota Racing Series results 
(key) (Races in bold indicate pole position) (Races in italics indicate fastest lap)

Complete FIA Formula 3 Championship results 
(key) (Races in bold indicate pole position; races in italics indicate points for the fastest lap of top ten finishers)

References

External links 
 
 

2002 births
Living people
Brazilian racing drivers
French F4 Championship drivers
Formula Renault Eurocup drivers
ADAC Formula 4 drivers
Auto Sport Academy drivers
Prema Powerteam drivers
R-ace GP drivers
MP Motorsport drivers
Racing drivers from São Paulo
Toyota Racing Series drivers
FIA Formula 3 Championship drivers
Karting World Championship drivers
UAE F4 Championship drivers
Van Amersfoort Racing drivers